Félix Marcelo González Gatica (born 26 May 1973) is a Chilean politician and public administrator who currently serves as a member of the Chamber of Deputies.

References

External links
 BCN Profile

1973 births
Living people
21st-century Chilean lawyers
Green Ecologist Party (Chile) politicians
21st-century Chilean politicians
University of Concepción alumni
People from Concepción, Chile